Eiken syndrome is a rare autosomal bone dysplasia with a skeletal phenotype which has been described in a unique consanguineous family, where it segregates as a recessive trait.

References

Further reading
 
 Eiken M, Prag J, Petersen K, Kaufmann H: - A new familial skeletal dysplasia with severely retarded ossification and abnormal modeling of bones especially of the epiphyses, the hands, and feet. Eur J Pediatr 1984, 141:231-235.

External links 

Rare syndromes